Jafar Djabouro Moumouni (born 19 November 1982) is a Togolese former footballer who played for F.C. Aboomoslem in the Iran Pro League.

He left Chaux-de-Fonds on 30 September 2008.

Club career stats
Last update: 26 February 2010

External links

Togolese footballers
Togolese expatriate footballers
Togo international footballers
Association football central defenders
1982 births
Living people
Expatriate footballers in Iran
Expatriate footballers in Switzerland
SR Delémont players
FC Concordia Basel players
FC Wangen bei Olten players
FC Lausanne-Sport players
BSC Old Boys players
F.C. Aboomoslem players
2000 African Cup of Nations players
2002 African Cup of Nations players
Place of birth missing (living people)
21st-century Togolese people